Hungary competed at the 1928 Summer Olympics in Amsterdam, Netherlands. 109 competitors, 93 men and 16 women, took part in 63 events in 12 sports.

Medalists

|  style="text-align:left; width:78%; vertical-align:top;"|

Default sort order: Medal, Date, Name

| style="text-align:left; width:22%; vertical-align:top;"|

Multiple medalists
The following competitors won multiple medals at the 1928 Olympic Games.

Athletics

Boxing

Men's Flyweight (– 50.8 kg)
 Antal Kocsis
 First Round — Bye
 Second Round — Defeated José Villanova Pueyo (ESP), points
 Quarterfinals — Defeated Hubert Ausböck (GER), points
 Semifinals — Defeated Carlo Covagnioli (ITA), points
 Final — Defeated Armand Apell (FRA), points

Equestrian

Fencing

17 fencers, 14 men and 3 women, represented Hungary in 1928.
Men's foil
 György Rozgonyi
 Zoltán Schenker
 Gusztáv Kálniczky

Men's team foil
 Ödön von Tersztyánszky, György Rozgonyi, György Piller-Jekelfalussy, József Rády, Gusztáv Kálniczky, Péter Tóth

Men's épée
 József Rády
 János Hajdú
 Ottó Hátszeghy

Men's team épée
 József Rády, János Hajdú, Albert Bógathy, György Piller-Jekelfalussy, Ottó Hátszeghy

Men's sabre
 Ödön von Tersztyánszky
 Attila Petschauer
 Sándor Gombos

Men's team sabre
 Ödön von Tersztyánszky, János Garay, Attila Petschauer, József Rády, Sándor Gombos, Gyula Glykais

Women's foil
 Margit Danÿ
 Gizella Tary
 Erna Bogen-Bogáti

Gymnastics

Modern pentathlon

One male fencer represented Hungary in 1928.

 Tivadar Filótás

Rowing

Sailing

Swimming

Water Polo

Wrestling

Art competitions

References

External links
Official Olympic Reports
International Olympic Committee results database

Nations at the 1928 Summer Olympics
1928
1928 in Hungarian sport